Telcon may refer to:

 Telcon, Air Traffic Control telephone conference
 Telegraph Construction and Maintenance Company (Telcon), British submarine telegraph cable manufacturer, initially operating out of Enderby's Wharf.
 Telco Construction Equipment, Indian construction equipment manufacturer